Yuri Pavlovich Pshenichnikov (Russian: Юрий Павлович Пшеничников; 2 June 1940 – 20 December 2019) was a Soviet football goalkeeper and coach, born in Tashkent.

Honours
 Soviet Top League winner: 1970.
 Soviet Goalkeeper of the Year: 1968.
 Lao League winner: 1981, 1982 (as a manager).
 Lao Cup winner: 1980 (as a manager).

International career
He earned 19 caps for the USSR national football team, and participated in UEFA Euro 1968.

References

External links
Profile (in Russian)

1940 births
2019 deaths
Uzbekistani footballers
Soviet footballers
Soviet Union international footballers
UEFA Euro 1968 players
Soviet Top League players
PFC CSKA Moscow players
Pakhtakor Tashkent FK players
Soviet football managers
Sportspeople from Tashkent
FC SKA Rostov-on-Don managers
Association football goalkeepers